Kim Ye-eun is a South Korean actress and model. She is known for her roles in Sweet Revenge 2.

Filmography

Film

Television series

Web series

Hosting

Awards and nominations 
 Awarded 2016 The 86th National Chunhyang Selection Competition

References

External links 
 
 

1996 births
Living people
21st-century South Korean actresses
South Korean female models
South Korean television actresses
South Korean film actresses